Steven Todd Bauer, MSM (born June 12, 1959) is a retired professional road bicycle racer from Canada. He won the first Olympic medal in road cycling for Canada and until 2022 he was the only Canadian to win an individual stage of the Tour de France (both Ryder Hesjedal and Svein Tuft and Alex Stieda had been part of winning team time trial squads).

Cycling career
Bauer joined the Canadian national cycling team in 1977, competing in team pursuit. He would remain on the national team for seven years, winning the national road race championship in 1981, 1982, and 1983, competing in the Commonwealth Games (1978, 1982), the Pan American Games (1979).

He capped his amateur career with a silver medal in the men's cycling road race at the 1984 Summer Olympics in Los Angeles. This was the first medal in road cycling for Canada at the Olympics.

Bauer turned professional following the Olympics, and in his second professional race, won the bronze medal at the world cycling championship road race in Barcelona.

Between 1985 and 1995, he competed in 11 Tours de France.
He began his professional career in 1985 on the La Vie Claire team of Bernard Hinault and Greg LeMond, where he stayed until leaving for Weinmann / La Suisse in 1988.
Bauer finished fourth in the 1988 Tour, winning the first stage and wearing the yellow jersey for five days, the second Canadian to wear the jersey. The first was Alex Stieda in 1986, who was also the first North American to wear the yellow jersey.

At the 1988 world championship, Bauer disputed the final sprint with Belgium's Claude Criquielion and Italy's Maurizio Fondriest. As Criquielion tried to pass against the barriers, he rode into Bauer. Criquielion lost equilibrium, and struck a policeman and the feet of the barriers, crashing. Meanwhile, Fondriest passed and won the race. Bauer was disqualified, but once Criquielion sued Bauer for assault and battery, the municipal court of Oudenaarde ruled in Bauer's favour. The ruling was upheld in both the Appeal Court and the Supreme court, at which stage Criquielion was fined for bringing the case a third time in a process that lasted for more than five years.

In 1989 Bauer won the Züri-Metzgete. In 1990, he took second place in Paris–Roubaix to Belgian Eddy Planckaert. The finish was so close that the officials had to study the photo-finish for more than ten minutes before Planckaert was finally declared the winner. After 266 kilometers of racing, Planckaert had just edged Bauer by less than a centimeter, making it the closest finish of the race's history.

Riding for 7-Eleven, Bauer wore the Yellow Jersey for nine stages during the 1990 Tour, finishing 27th. For his 1993 Paris–Roubaix campaign, he had a bike built by the Merckx factory with "an extreme rearward seat position" to test his theory that it would "engag[e] the quadriceps more efficiently" and with it "more power to the pedals". He failed to make the top ten (finishing over 4 minutes behind the winner in 23rd place ) and never rode that bike again.

In 1994, he was awarded the Meritorious Service Medal (civil division) for having "paved the way for Canada's coming generations of cycling enthusiasts".

In 1996, with professionals allowed in the Olympics, Bauer became a member of the Canadian team for the 1996 Summer Olympics, finishing 41st in the road race. He announced his retirement later that year at 37. The following year, he co-founded Steve Bauer Bike Tours.

In 2005 Steve was inducted to the Canadian Olympic Hall of Fame  and the Canadian Sport Hall of Fame. Bauer also participated in the Red Bull Road Rage held on Tuna Canyon, Malibu, California.

In 2013, Bauer raced in the Canadian Cycling Championships in the Men's 50-59 road race and finished fourth.

In 2015, Bauer raced in the Canadian Track Championships in the Men's 50-59 and finished 1st in the Scratch race, 1st in the Individual Pursuit and 2nd in the Points Race.

Team management
In September 2007, Bauer co-founded Cycle Sport Management which developed and owned a UCI Continental men road cycling team from 2008 to 2010 and a UCI Pro Continental men road cycling team in 2011 and 2012.

In 2021 he joined Astana–Premier Tech as a sporting director.

Career achievements

Major results

1981
 1st  Road race, National Road Championships
 1st  Points race, National Track Championships
 Coors Classic
1st Stages 9 & 11
1982
 1st  Road race, National Road Championships
 1st  Points race, National Track Championships
 2nd  Road race, Commonwealth Games
1983
 1st  Road race, National Road Championships
 5th Gran Premio della Liberazione
1984
 2nd  Road race, Olympic Games
 3rd  Road race, UCI Road World Championships
 3rd Gran Premio della Liberazione
1985
 1st Grand Prix d'Aix-en-Provence
 Coors Classic
1st Stages 2, 11 & 16
 1st Stage 2a Route du Sud
 3rd Overall Tour du Haut Var
 3rd Züri-Metzgete
 4th Tour Méditerranéen
 8th Rund um den Henninger Turm
 9th Milan–San Remo
 10th Overall Tour de France
1st Stage 3 (TTT)
Held  after Prologue–Stage 16
1986
 2nd Overall Nissan Classic
1st Stage 2
 2nd Züri-Metzgete
 2nd Rund um den Henninger Turm
 4th Tour of Flanders
 5th Gent–Wevelgem
1987
 1st Stage 1 Critérium International
 3rd Overall Tour de Picardie
 4th Tour of Flanders
 6th Overall Vuelta a Andalucía
 8th Overall Three Days of De Panne
 10th Overall Giro d'Italia
 10th Züri-Metzgete
1988
 1st  Overall Tour de Picardie
 1st Grand Prix des Amériques
 1st Trofeo Pantalica
 1st Stage 1b Critérium du Dauphiné Libéré
 2nd Overall Tour de Suisse
1st Stage 8
 3rd Giro del Lazio
 4th Overall Tour de France
1st Stage 1
Held  after Stages 1 & 8–11
Held  after Stages 1–2
 4th Overall Étoile de Bessèges
1st Stage 1
 6th Amstel Gold Race
 6th Gent–Wevelgem
 8th Paris–Roubaix
1989
 1st Züri-Metzgete
 1st Prologue Critérium du Dauphiné Libéré
 3rd Amstel Gold Race
 4th Overall Tour de Suisse
 5th UCI Road World Cup
 7th Omloop Het Volk
 10th Tour of Flanders
1990
 2nd Paris–Roubaix
 5th Grand Prix des Amériques
 7th UCI Road World Cup
 8th Overall Nissan Classic
 9th Gent–Wevelgem
 Tour de France
Held  after Stages 1–9
1991
 Tour DuPont
Stage 7 & 10
 4th Paris–Roubaix
1992
 1st Stage 2 Volta a Galicia
1994
 1st Stage 3 Tour DuPont
 6th Paris–Tours
 8th E3 Prijs Vlaanderen
1996
 Rheinland-Pfalz Rundfahrt
1st Stage 9 & 10
 Niedersachsen Rundfahrt
1st Stages 1b & 6

References

External links
 Steve Bauer Bike Tours
 Team Planet Energy
 
 
 Official Tour de France results for Steve Bauer

1959 births
Living people
Canadian male cyclists
Canadian Tour de France stage winners
Cyclists from Ontario
Cyclists at the 1984 Summer Olympics
Cyclists at the 1996 Summer Olympics
Recipients of the Meritorious Service Decoration
Olympic cyclists of Canada
Olympic silver medalists for Canada
Sportspeople from St. Catharines
Olympic medalists in cycling
Tour de Suisse stage winners
Medalists at the 1984 Summer Olympics
Commonwealth Games silver medallists for Canada
Commonwealth Games medallists in cycling
Cyclists at the 1982 Commonwealth Games
Medallists at the 1982 Commonwealth Games